The leu/phe-leader RNA motif (also the  lactis-leu/phe-leader motif) is a conserved RNA structure identified by bioinformatics.  These RNAs function as peptide leaders.  They contain a short open reading frame (ORF) that contains many codons for leucine or phenylalanine.  Normally, expression of the downstream genes is suppressed.  However, when cellular concentrations of the relevant amino acid is low, ribosome stalling leads to an alternate structure that enables downstream gene expression.

Leu/phe leaders of this structure are known only in the species Lactococcus lactis, and is essentially the same as a previously characterized leucine leader in the same species.  Additional homologs were uncovered that contain phenylalanine codons instead of leucine codons, and are upstream of genes involved in the synthesis of phenylalanine, instead of leucine.

References

External links
 

Cis-regulatory RNA elements